Candelaria is a mountain in the Andes of Bolivia. It is situated in the Potosí Department, Daniel Campos Province, Llica Municipality, Chacoma Canton, north east of Alto Toroni and south of Alto Totoni.

See also
 Iru Phutunqu
List of mountains in the Andes

References 

Mountains of Oruro Department